is a 2012 freeware horror video game published and developed by kouri for Microsoft Windows. Players control the titular character from a top-down perspective trapped in an eldritch art museum, later revealed to be titled the "Fabricated World", where they meet the characters Garry and Mary. Together, they make the goal of escaping the gallery and returning to the real world.

Ib is the debut game of developer kouri, and was developed using RPG Maker 2000. The art and sprites were created by kouri, and the game was made in a two-dimensional style. 

Upon release in 2012, Ib was a critical and commercial success, and in 2014 achieved over 2 million downloads across Japan and the United States. The game received praise from critics and audiences alike, particularly for its gameplay, plot, characters, and atmosphere. It has since attained a cult following, and Ib has been credited with helping popularize its engine's use in developing games without role-playing elements.

A remake using RPG Maker MV with updated graphics was published by Playism and released on Steam for Japanese localization only on April 11, 2022. An English localization was released on May 17, 2022. A version for the Nintendo Switch was announced 13 September 2022, to be released on 9 March 2023.

Gameplay 
The player moves a character through two-dimensional fields, interacting with and examining various objects. Obstacles come in the forms of blocked paths, which the player must overcome, and enemies or traps that deplete the player character's health. Once health reaches zero, the player loses. The player wins by seeing the narrative through to one of its ends. The game's English translator has said that the game is not demanding of the player's reflexes.

Plot 
The game takes place at some point after the year 6235, as the numbers given with the paintings are years, as confirmed by the Japanese kanji for the game's script. A young girl, Ib, is taken to fictitious artist Guertena Weiss' art museum by her mother and father. With her parents' permission, Ib wanders off on her own. She examines a painting she does not understand as the museum abruptly empties during a power outage, its doors locking before she can leave with the other guests. A series of paint splatters guide her into a different painting of the deep sea, which she physically enters. Trapped in an alien, painted world, Ib eventually discovers a purple-haired figure on the ground, where the game requires you to retrieve his rose and replenish its life. After doing so, it is revealed that the figure is Garry, a soft-spoken young man sporting tattered clothes. They join forces and as they explore, they develop a close bond, and Garry becomes protective and nurturing of Ib.

Later on, the pair come across Mary, a eccentric girl who is believed to be around Ib's age. She joins the group, and the three continue to explore. Upon inspection of a painting further in the game, the group are separated by a wall of emerging stone vines, leaving Garry by his lonesome meanwhile Ib and Mary are together as a duo. Known as the "separation puzzle", the player can control both sides in certain areas and must work to reunite once again. It is soon revealed to Garry that the "antagonist" of the game is Mary, whose true identity was a painting. Later "endings" would also reveal a backstory, possibly which influences her actions. 

Later in the game, the player will discover Mary's painting where they must then burn it, which effectively kills Mary. This can be encountered with or without Garry, who will either survive or die depending on the player's actions. The player will soon after come across a large painting, which is required for the player to jump through in order to escape. Depending on the player's actions, a distraction will appear each time they are about to do so (the only exception being if the player is on route to the "Together, Forever" ending); if Ib follows suit on that distraction, she will be stuck in the Fabricated World, and this will result in the "Ib All Alone" ending. 

Soon after, the player finds their way back to the real world, where Ib will have lost all of her memory regarding her experiences in the Fabricated World. If Garry survives, she will see him at the "Embodiment of Spirit" statue, where two scenarios can happen; depending on the player's actions, Garry will either recount no memory alike to Ib and leave, resulting in the ending "Memory's Crannies", or he will remember their past experiences and promise for the two to meet each other once again, leading to what is considered to be the game's best ending, the "Promise of Reunion". If Garry does not make it back to the real world, then one of two things can happen depending on the players actions; Ib will leave with her parents, resulting in the ending "Forgotten Portrait". If Mary was not killed before Ib escaped, then Mary will follow her back into the real world where she will be recognized by Ib's parents as their second child, before they all leave the gallery, resulting in the "Together, Forever" ending.

Characters

Main characters 

A young girl, believed to be roughly 9 years of age. Ib has long, straight brown hair and red eyes. One day, Ib becomes trapped in Weiss Guertena's art museum.

Kouri describes in his official blog posts that Ib is the heroine; "Red-themed. Her family is upper-class, so her skirt goes just down to her knees." When showing the original first design of Ib, he notes, "the expression isn't quite right, but her clothes hardly changed." He mentions Ib "loves her mother. Of course, she gets along with father too." Initially, Kouri planned to have the menu image change for every petal the player lost of the rose. So Ib would look more ragged when she got down to 3 petals, but it "was too much of a hassle."

Despite possible other translations for her name (such as "Eve") her name is officially written in English by Kouri as "Ib". That her name was officially meant to be "Eve" is a common misconception among fans, as Kouri has stated a clear preference for "Ib".

A soft-spoken young man with lavender-like colored hair, dressed in tattered clothes who becomes protective and nurturing of Ib, as they try to escape the art gallery together (depending on players' choices). As the game progresses, Garry can go to extreme measures to protect Ib, even to the point of risking his life.

While Garry is often assumed to be an adult by fans, his official age and birthday are unknown. Instead of speaking with the dialect of a middle-aged Japanese man, he speaks using feminine pronouns and dialect (such as "onee", lit. "big sister"), similar to lavender linguistics. Despite this, he also refers to himself multiple times as a "man"; however, his use of such pronouns may associate him as a member of the LGBT community. Creator Kouri has also referred to him in blog posts and official art of Garry dressed in Japanese women's kimono as "Garry’s someone who'd like to cross the barriers of gender"; and has also mentioned regarding an official artwork of Garry as a witch, "Making Garry a witch, naturally, doesn’t feel off in the slightest." In the game, nothing is stated about his past or background prior to the game, other than Garry briefly mentioning near the start of the game he should have maybe worn better clothing to the art gallery.

In other blog posts as well as his art gallery, Kouri describes Garry's design as "stylish", stating "He’s got a stylish design" and describing him as "Ib's support". Kouri also mentions for Garry; "It was hard drawing distinctive expressions since he only shows one eye." Kouri says he likes the idea of Garry's "coat fluttering around wherever he goes" and mentions, "I fiddled with the ruggedness of the coat over time... He has a tank-top underneath." He mentions "Garry’s strange, but very easy to like." He finishes the section on Garry with "His personality’s very feminine, too", again relating to and confirming Garry's feminine personality. A design of Garry with pink hair is shown; Kouri stating "Garry would have been nice with pink hair, but I scrapped it because he stood out more than the protagonist and it didn’t fit the mood at all."

The Japanese spelling of his name could be romanized as "Gerii" or "Garii"; however, it is officially written in English by Kouri as "Garry".

Dressed in a long green dress, with long blonde hair; a mischievous, eccentric girl who initially looks and acts roughly around Ib's age; noted to have an "innocent" personality. Later revealed to be a painting, Mary's ultimate desire, as shown by the various initial endings; is to leave the "Fabricated World" and live as a human in the real world.

Later on, in additional "endings" released after the initial set of endings, Mary is revealed to be Weiss Guertena's "daughter", as a painting that he painted (a blog post on Kouri's website after the reveal also shows her happily holding out a yellow rose for "father".) A common misconception by fans is that Mary was his granddaughter. However, due to the years given on the paintings, Guertena's death prior to the games' start, and Ib's and Garry's own presumed ages; Mary may be mentally "developed" as an adult (or young adult), despite also retaining the aforementioned "innocent" personality (due to her being sheltered and apart from humans in the art gallery).

Kouri describes in his official blog posts that "She loves cute things", "Also playing. And delicious things." He "had a lot of trouble settling on a color" for her dress, at one point also considering designs featuring the colors of white and blue; navy blue; and orange and black. Personally, Kouri liked the navy design "just as much. But it seemed too ocean-esque, so" he scrapped it. Kouri wished he could have made a few more "discussions" between her and Garry.

Other characters 

The creator of the art gallery; noted initially by many to be a rather mysterious man. As the player progresses in the game, more small pieces of Guertena's history are revealed.

According to his Diary, Guertena believed that people can impart their spirit in the things they create; this including artwork. Guertena's goal was to immerse himself in his work in order to impart his spirit into his creations.

Later on, in additional "endings" released after the initial set of endings, Mary is revealed to be his "daughter", as a painting that he painted.

In his self portrait, Guertena wears a white long-sleeved shirt, and can be seen holding a paint brush in his left hand, which hints that Guertena might be left-handed. The picture that he is painting is the portrait of Mary. His face is never shown, leaving the rest of his appearance mysterious. He died prior to the game; of presumed natural causes.

Ib’s Parents
Noted to be high-class, as Ib is from an upper-class family. They initially accompany Ib to the art gallery, but disappear along with everyone else when the lights first go out.

Ib's father, a young man, has dark brown hair, dark blue eyes, and pale skin. He wears a blue suit and a green tie. A polite, kind, and also sweet man like Garry; gentle in both words and appearance, he trusts Ib and seems to get along well with her, as portrayed in Kouri's old sketches. Noted to be very "intimidated" by art. Carefree; he also seems to forget things easily. He obviously loves Ib and, to his wife's disapproval, tends to buy her a lot of stuffed bunny plush dolls, including one which he gave her on her 9th birthday prior to the game's start. He and his wife also appear portrayed together in a portrait in the Fabricated World ("Couple"). He is mentioned very infrequently, and much less so than his wife, thus, his role has little significance. Neither he nor his wife speak with the dialects older Japanese middle-aged people would use; also making it very unlikely Garry is older than them, as Garry does not, either (and, neither does Mary).

Ib's mother is a young woman, with long, well-kept dark brown hair that is tied up in a fancy and fashionable-looking ponytail, red eyes, and pale skin. She wears a red dress with sleeves, and with a red gem on her neck collar. She acts loving and caring towards her daughter, and very much overall like a "mother", and seemingly does not want to spoil Ib much, as she disapproved of Ib's father giving Ib a lot of stuffed bunny plush dolls for her birthday or otherwise (and because Ib had many already). She lets Ib wander off on her own to explore the art gallery at the start of the game, but also expects Ib to behave. Ib shortly (as always) tells Mary at one point that her mother becomes "angry" sometimes, during which she "isn't nice", likely because of such disciplining of her daughter. However, she also trusts Ib to be responsible, especially where Ib's handkerchief is concerned (the handkerchief item of which also playing a significant role in the best "good ending", among other variations, likely due in part to her telling Ib to be responsible). She warns Ib to stay away from strangers, which foreshadows later endings of the game.

In some "Bad Endings", among others, a "Fake Mother" appears, trying to deceive Ib and telling her to stay away from strangers (in many cases, Garry is also there). If Ib chooses to go with the "Fake Mother", the player will receive the "Bad Ending" of "Ib All Alone".

If Ib escapes the Fabricated World, Ib's mother can be found looking at paintings in the art gallery, and in some versions of the endings tells Ib that it is time to leave.

Reception 

Ib has gained a cult following in the horror indie game field. It has received praise for its atmosphere, music and general design, and has garnered comparisons to Yume Nikki.

The Witch's House creator, Fummy, has claimed that Ib heavily influenced the game's minimal use of dialogue.

By the start of 2014, Kouri mentioned on his website that Ib broke 1,150,000 downloads in Japan. There was a similar number of downloads on the English side.

Ib also received some official merchandise, such as mini 3D figurines sold at Animate shops around Japan in early 2014; a 2013 calendar sold at Comiket 83; mascot plush dolls of Ib, Garry, and Mary sold as arcade prizes around late January 2013 at Taito Station; and a tote bag and a wine glass sold at "Guertena Shop".

References

External links 
  

2012 video games
Adventure games
Freeware games
2010s horror video games
Indie video games
Nintendo Switch games
RPG Maker games
Single-player video games
Video games developed in Japan
Video games featuring female protagonists
Windows games